The Venice Vanguard was a newspaper circulated in Venice, California, beginning in 1907.  By 1984 it had become a "throwaway shopper."

History

The paper was founded by William A. Rennie, Venice's justice of the peace (Ballona Township) and city recorder. Its first issue on June 17, 1907, was a four-page paper, each page measuring 9 by 12 inches, "the editor first writing the news, then setting the type, finally 'kicking it off' on the old press, and lastly, distributing the papers."

By 1908, the business "had assumed such proportions that an addition of 30x20 feet was added to the building, a pony power press installed, a lot of new type put in, and the paper enlarged to a five-column folio."

Rennie's sons, Robert H. Rennie and Walter W. Rennie, joined the firm in January 1910. The paper was owned by the Santa Monica Outlook Company in 1911.

On July 19, 1913, the Vanguard printed ten thousand copies of "the largest newspaper ever published by any Southern California beach city," to mark its sixth anniversary. The "prosperity edition," as it was called, amounted to 56 pages in seven parts.

A building permit was issued on August 27, 1913, to W.A. Rennie & Sons for the construction of a one-story, red-pressed brick building at Mildred Avenue and Strongs Drive to house the newspaper's offices.

In 1920, the newspaper was sold to George Tompkins of Imperial Valley, California.
Tompkins sold the company to F.W. Kellogg and Edward A. Dickson in 1922. Edward S. Kellogg was to be business manager and Fenne H. Webb was to continue as city editor.

A statement by the new owners said that Venice should seek annexation to Los Angeles "only as an absolute necessity, which does not exist today and which cannot exist for several years," perhaps "if there is no possibility of securing an adequate water supply for Venice, Ocean Park, and Santa Monica." The new owners pledged the paper to support the opening and widening of Main Street and of Trolleyway; the acquisition of the Santa Monica beaches by the city, and the building of a yacht harbor.

In the early 1920s, C.H. Garrigues was the editor. In 1925 the newspaper was known as the Venice Vanguard-Herald. John B. Daniell was publisher, first mentioned in 1926 and as "former publisher" in 1931.

The newspaper became a daily before World War II but reverted to a weekly in 1941, yet by 1949 the newspaper had again become a daily known as the Venice Evening Vanguard. The James S. Copley organization had purchased the  newspaper in 1928, then sold it in 1969 to Edwin W. Dean Jr., publisher of the Inglewood Daily News.

Legal problems

In 1906, the newspaper published an article, later termed an "allegory," a take-off of Charles Dickens' A Tale of Two Cities, and meant to be amusing, which mentioned Abbot Kinney, the founder of Venice, and W.H. Anderson. A court held the reference to be libelous but levied only a small sum, $750, as recompense, to be paid by Kinney to Anderson. More than a hundred thousand dollars had been sought in the five suits filed. The trial was a lengthy one, but the jury deliberated for only sixteen minutes.

References

English-language newspapers published in North America
Venice, Los Angeles
Defunct newspapers published in California
Newspapers published in Greater Los Angeles
Weekly newspapers published in California